The State-of-the-Art Car (SOAC) was a heavy rail mass transit demonstrator vehicle produced for the United States Department of Transportation's Urban Mass Transportation Administration in the 1970s. It was intended to demonstrate the latest technologies to operating agencies and the riding public, and serve to promote existing and proposed transit lines. A single married pair was produced by the St. Louis Car Company in 1972. It operated in intermittent revenue service on six rapid transit systems in five United States cities between May 1974 and January 1977. Since 1989, the two cars have been on display at the Seashore Trolley Museum in Kennebunkport, Maine.

Design and development

Around 1970, the United States Department of Transportation's Urban Mass Transportation Administration (UMTA) began the Urban Rapid Rail Vehicle and Systems Program with the intention of creating a new rapid transit vehicle for use on existing and proposed systems. The new cars were to represent the state of the art in transit vehicle technology; priority was placed on making them comfortable, safe, reliable, and quiet to attract passengers. Boeing Vertol was selected in 1971 to manage the State-of-the-Art Car (SOAC) project.

The Budd Company, Pullman-Standard, Rohr Industries, the St. Louis Car Company, and Vought bid for a contract to produce a two-car demonstrator set, which was won by the St. Louis Car Company. The design was based on the R44 subway car, which the company had recently produced for the New York City Subway, with influences from recently produced BART rolling stock. The two SOAC demonstrator cars were completed in 1972; along with the R44, they were the last rolling stock produced by the company. The SOAC cars cost $350,000 each, compared to $300,000 each for the R44.

The SOAC was built to meet the loading gauge of existing rapid transit systems in Boston, Chicago, Cleveland, New York City, and Philadelphia. It was restricted to certain lines, including the IND Division in New York City and the Skokie Swift in Chicago because other parts of those systems had smaller loading gauges.

The two demonstrator cars were built with two different configurations: "Lo-Density" with a total capacity of 220 passengers per car, and "Hi-Density" with 300-passenger capacity. The "Hi-Density" car had a mixture of transverse and longitudinal seating, with a total of 72 seats. The "Lo-Density" car had 62 seats in three sections: one with only transverse seats, one with a mix of seat types, and one with a mix of seat types and two tables. Both demonstrator cars were "A" cars with a cab at one end. The SOAC used third rail power in most locations, but power was collected from overhead lines in Chicago and Cleveland.

Testing

The SOAC was first tested at the High Speed Ground Test Center in Pueblo, Colorado. On August 11, 1973, the test train collided with a freight car due to a mis-set switch, killing the operator. The collision focused additional attention on the safety of the SOAC design.

After the initial testing, the SOAC set toured six rapid transit systems in five United States cities for additional testing and public rides. (The other two operating systems were excluded: then-newly opened BART used  broad gauge tracks, while PATH had a small loading gauge that allowed only -long, -wide cars.)

Revenue service began on the New York City Subway on May 17, 1974; the SOAC ran on the A, D, E, and N services until July 19. It was then operated in revenue service on the MBTA Red Line in Boston for a month beginning on August 19, 1974. The SOAC demonstrator was then tested on the CTS Airport Line later in 1974, with fifteen days of revenue service.

The SOAC next operated on the CTA Skokie Swift line for thirteen days of revenue service in January 1975. The cars were slightly wider and substantially longer than other CTA rolling stock; the platforms at the two Skokie Swift stations were modified with retractable edges. The next stop was Philadelphia, where the SOAC operated on revenue service on the SEPTA Broad Street Line from March 6 to April 2, 1975. Over this initial testing program, the SOAC operated  over 104 days, carrying an estimated 312,000 passengers. After the completion of the original testing program, the SOAC was transferred to the PATCO Speedline for additional service, with non-revenue tests taking place on May 1, 1975. After vehicle modifications and insurance negotiations, a planned nine months of revenue service began on August 12, 1976. By the time operations ceased on January 24, 1977, the cars had only operated in revenue service for 23 days.

The SOAC was well received by the public, particularly due to the quiet operation and air conditioning, as well as by the train operators, who found it easy to control. The operating agencies had more mixed reactions; only some found it useful. After the SOAC and the mixed results of the US Standard Light Rail Vehicle program, UMTA did not pursue further vehicle designs, but instead focused on subsystem research. A number of design elements from the SOAC – including acoustic design, air-ride suspension, chopper propulsion controls, and traction motor ventilation – were incorporated on future rolling stock designs by numerous agencies.

The SOAC cars were stored at Boeing Vertol until May 1979, when one was shipped to the Budd Company and one to Pueblo, where they were used for additional subsystem testing. The two-car demonstrator was acquired by the Seashore Trolley Museum in Kennebunkport, Maine as a static display in 1989 and has remained there since.

See also
 Intermediate Capacity Transit System

References

External links 

Seashore Trolley Museum – State of the Art Cars

Electric multiple units of the United States
New York City Subway rolling stock
600 V DC multiple units
Train-related introductions in 1974
Chicago "L" rolling stock